Lieutenant General Sir Frederick Charles Shaw  ( 31 July 1861 – 6 January 1942) was a British Army general who served in the Boer War and the First World War. He became Commander-in-Chief, Ireland, and retired in 1920.

Family
Shaw was born on 31 July 1861, the son of John Shaw of Normanton, Derbyshire. He was educated at Repton School. He married Florence Edith Denton, daughter of Reverend Canon Denton of Ashby-de-la-Zouch. She died in 1918; they had one daughter.

Military career
Shaw was commissioned into the Sherwood Foresters as a lieutenant on 28 January 1882. He saw service in the Anglo-Egyptian War later the same year, and was promoted to captain on 14 October 1889.

Promoted to major on 11 October 1899, he served during the Second Boer War as a Brigade Major, then as Deputy Assistant Adjutant-General and then as Assistant Adjutant-General. He received the brevet rank of lieutenant colonel on 29 November 1900. Following the end of the war, he return to the United Kingdom in August 1902. In 1907 he was made commanding officer  (CO) of the 2nd Battalion, Sherwood Foresters.

He served in World War I, initially commanding the 3rd Division's 9th Brigade in which role he deployed to France. He was wounded by a shell that hit his headquarters on 12 November 1914. After his recovery, in 1915, he was initially appointed as general officer commanding (GOC) of the 29th Division on its mobilisation in January. Just two months later, however, he was replaced by Aylmer Hunter-Weston and was later appointed Commander of the 13th (Western) Division. He then became Director of Home Defence and subsequently Chief of the General Staff for Home Forces.
 
On 19 September 1919, during the Irish War of Independence, he suggested that the police force in Ireland be expanded via the recruitment of a special force of volunteer British ex-servicemen. Following direct intervention from London, the "Black and Tans" and Auxiliary Division of the Constabulary were introduced in order to achieve a decisive result. This intervention preceded a purge of the Irish administration at Dublin Castle during which Shaw himself was replaced.

Shaw retired in 1920 and died on 6 January 1942.

References

|-

|-

1861 births
1942 deaths
Military personnel from Derbyshire
British Army lieutenant generals
People from Derby
People educated at Repton School
Sherwood Foresters officers
British Army personnel of the Anglo-Egyptian War
British Army personnel of the Second Boer War
British Army generals of World War I
Commanders-in-Chief, Ireland
Knights Commander of the Order of the Bath
British military personnel of the Irish War of Independence
Members of the Privy Council of Ireland